James Paul Chapin (July 9, 1889 – April 5, 1964) was an American ornithologist and curator of the American Museum of Natural History.

Biography
Chapin is one of the highest-regarded ornithologists of the twentieth century. He was joint leader (with Herbert Lang) of the Lang–Chapin expedition, which made a biological survey of the Belgian Congo between 1909 and 1915. For his work The Birds of the Belgian Congo, Part I, he was awarded the Daniel Giraud Elliot Medal from the National Academy of Sciences in 1932. He received a bachelor's degree in 1916, master's degree in 1917, and a doctorate in 1932, all from Columbia University, and then began a lengthy career at the American Museum of Natural History.

Chapin served as the 17th president of The Explorers Club from 1949 to 1950.

Legacy
Chapin is commemorated in the scientific names of three species of African reptiles: Ichnotropis chapini, Pelusios chapini, and Trioceros chapini.
Chapin returned to the Belgian Congo in 1953 to continue fieldwork which he had started more than half a century earlier. When asked about his most famous discovery, he mentioned the Congo peafowl, adding that he had obtained a feather from this hitherto unknown bird from a pygmy on one of his expeditions, but had never seen the bird. It was unknown to science. Years later he was able to identify it as the rare Congo peafowl.

References

External links

1889 births
1964 deaths
American curators
American ornithologists
People from Staten Island
People associated with the American Museum of Natural History
Scientists from New York (state)
20th-century American zoologists

Columbia College (New York) alumni
Columbia Graduate School of Arts and Sciences alumni